Marcel Hendrickx (21 August 1935 – 26 October 2020) was a Belgian politician and member of the Flemish Christian Democrat Party.

Hendrickx was mayor of Turnhout from 1995 until 2008. In 2009, he became chairman of KFC Turnhout. He served until 2015.

References

1935 births
2020 deaths
People from Turnhout
Belgian football chairmen and investors
Christian Democratic and Flemish politicians
Mayors of places in Belgium